Common names: Mexican python, Mexican burrowing python, Mexican burrowing snake.

Loxocemus bicolor,the sole member of the monotypic family Loxocemidae, is a species of python-like snake found in Mexico and Central America.  No subspecies are currently recognized. Analyses of DNA show that Loxocemus is most closely related to the true pythons and the sunbeam snakes.

Description
The body is stout and very muscular. The snout is shovel-shaped, with a narrow head and small eyes to facilitate burrowing. It has been observed that both male and females have various scent glands on their bodies that secrete fatty acids and alcohols to deter nuisance arthropods, such as ants or other burrowing insects. The species is described as terrestrial and semi-fossorial, which makes them hard to observe and study. The color pattern is usually dark with patches of white scales, although occasionally after shedding all pigment will disappear, resulting in a white snake with only a small dark patch on its head. Scale coloring can also vary between pinkish-brown and reddish-brown, a source of camouflage depending on the soil type of the region an individual typically inhabits.

Distribution and habitat
It is found along the Mexican Pacific versant at low to moderate elevations in the states of Nayarit, Jalisco, Colima, Michoacán, Morelos, Guerrero, Oaxaca, and Chiapas. From there, its range extends south through Guatemala, Honduras, El Salvador, Nicaragua, and Costa Rica. The type locality given is "La Unión, San Salvador" (in El Salvador).

Lifecycle
They are found in a variety of habitats, including tropical, moist, and dry forests. In Honduras and Guatemala, they also occur in dry inland valleys that drain into the Caribbean. Their diet is believed to consist of rodents and lizards. In addition, they prey on arthropods, such as underground insects and centipedes, as well as worms. They have also been observed eating iguana eggs, in addition to having been observed to eat sea turtle eggs and hatchlings when food in scarce. They are oviparous, laying small clutches of two to four eggs. In order to consume eggs, individuals have been observed to wrap two to three loops of its anterior trunk to pressurize and pierce an egg before swallowing the yolk whole.

References

Further reading

External links

 
 Family loxocemidae 

 
Reptiles of Mexico
Snakes of Central America
Reptiles of Guatemala
Taxa named by Edward Drinker Cope
Monotypic snake genera